Herichthys deppii, also known as the Nautla cichlid, is a species of cichlid native to the Nautla and Misantla rivers of Mexico. It reaches a maximum size of  TL. The specific name honours the German naturalist, explorer and painter, Ferdinand Deppe, (1794-1861) who collected the type specimen.

References

deppii
Endemic fish of Mexico
Freshwater fish of Mexico
Fish described in 1840
Taxa named by Johann Jakob Heckel